My Beautiful Broken Brain is a 2014 documentary film about the life of 34-year-old Lotje Sodderland after she suffered a hemorrhagic stroke as a result of a congenital vascular malformation in November 2011, initially experiencing aphasia, the complete loss of her ability to read, write, or speak coherently.

David Lynch became an executive producer of the film.

Content 

The film starts with a recap of the intracerebral hemorrhage (stroke) and subsequent emergency brain surgery on her parietal and temporal lobes, and follows the life of its protagonist, London resident Lotje Sodderland, in the year that followed, documenting the progress of her recovery and the major setbacks she experienced.

Lotje covers some of the daily challenges that she experienced after sustaining injury to her brain through the stroke, not just with dysphasia and apraxia while communicating through expressive verbal language, reading and writing, but also the memory deficits, confusion, cognitive processing and sensory perception changes, over-sensitivity to noise and the sensations of overwhelm, fatigue, frustration, and at times discouragement about future considering the changes in her life. The valuable support provided by her family and friends during this journey of recovery was featured prominently in this documentary. Through extensive in-patient and out-patient rehabilitation that included occupational therapy, speech therapy, visits with both a psychologist and psychiatrist, she makes a profound recovery, despite the post-seizure regression she experienced following the experimental transcranial magnetic stimulation (TMS) treatments.

Lotje began recording video-selfies just a few days after the stroke, while still in the hospital. Large parts of the film consist of material filmed by herself on her iPhone. This together with various sequences showing the world from her point-of-view at that time, including for example visual misperceptions (hallucinations), produce a rather personal storytelling style.

Production 

The film was initiated by its protagonist herself. According to her, making a film about her struggles was the first linear thought she had after the stroke.
She started taking video-selfies of herself while still in hospital, and two weeks later contacted documentary filmmaker Sophie Robinson to enlist her help.

Funding for editing and post-production was collected via Kickstarter between November 28 and December 20, 2013. The initial goal of £30,000 was exceeded by £7340.

Release 
My Beautiful Broken Brain had its world premiere at the 2014 International Documentary Film Festival Amsterdam, where it won the DOC U award.

Netflix started streaming the film as a Netflix Original worldwide on March 18, 2016.

References

External links
 Official website
 
 
 

Netflix original documentary films
2014 films
2014 documentary films
Stroke
2010s English-language films